AAG was the brand name of a German automobile company named Allgemeine Automobil-Gesellschaft Berlin GmbH which offered only one car, a 5 hp (4 kW) voiturette designed by one Professor Klingenberg and manufactured between 1900 and 1901. The company factory was bought by the politician Emil Rathenau, also the head of AEG. He renamed it to the Neue Automobil Gesellschaft (NAG for short), and the company produced cars until 1934.

Company history
The company of Berlin reported on 28 November 1899 a trademark for the name AAG, which was registered on 8 February 1900. Also in 1900 began the production of automobiles. The brand name was  AAG. In addition to the production of an own model, AAG also expelled motorized tricycles and electric cars from other manufacturers. 1901 ended the production. AEG took over the company and founded the National Automobile Company.

Vehicles
Georg Klingenberg constructed the only model that was also called Klingenberg-Car. It was a small car with a cylinder engine and 5 PS performance. The speed was given at 35 km / h. The first model of NAG was based on this vehicle.

Defunct motor vehicle manufacturers of Germany
Manufacturing companies based in Berlin
Companies of Prussia
Vehicles introduced in 1900